Diante do Trono's discography consists of live albums and studio albums. The band has sold over 15 million albums in a variety of formats.

Albums

Diante do Trono series (Live)

Another live albums

Crianças Diante do Trono albums

Studio albums

Instrumental

Ana Paula Valadão solo albums

CTMDT albums

Nations Before The Throne

See also
 Ana Paula Valadão
 Lagoinha Church

References

External links
 Diante do Trono website

Sources
 https://www.lojadiantedotrono.com

 
Discographies of Brazilian artists
Christian music discographies
Latin music discographies